The Yenching Scholarship (also Yanjing Scholars; Chinese: 燕京学者, pinyin: Yānjīng Xuézhě) is a prestigious interdisciplinary graduate program at the Yenching Academy of Peking University (PKU) in Beijing, China. 

The program, started in 2015, will provide Yenching Scholars, selected annually from around the world, with full scholarships for a two-years master's degree from Peking University. The program hosts in its own purpose-built residential college and is designed to cultivate leaders who will advocate for global progress and cultural understanding. 

Inspired by the classical Chinese academies known as Shūyuàn and the Rhodes Scholarship at Oxford University (Yenching Academy is called Yānjīng Xuétáng in Chinese, translated directly as Yanjing College), Yenching Academy at Peking University will compete with Schwarzman Scholars at Tsinghua University in China and similar global scholarship programs around the world. It is the first such program to launch in Asia.

Scholarship

Mission
Yenching Scholars is an intensive global leadership program designed to provide outstanding young scholars with a broad interdisciplinary graduate education that reflects global perspectives. The program is designed "to cultivate leaders who will advocate for global progress and cultural understanding."

Overview
The Yenching Scholarship will offer fully funded scholarships, including tuition, accommodation, transportation, and a living stipend to Yenching Scholars selected annually from around the world. The acceptance rate for the most recent cohort is 2.7 percent. Graduation from the Academy requires the successful completion of at least 31 academic credits, as well as writing and orally defending a master's thesis. The program will initially offer concentrations in law and society, economics and management, public policy and international relations, literature and culture, history and archaeology, and philosophy and religion. Upon graduation, graduates will receive one of the following degrees: Master of Law (Politics & International Relations, Law & Society); Master of Economics (Economics & Management); Master of History (History & Archaeology); Master of Literature (Literature and Culture); or Master of Philosophy in China Studies (Philosophy & Religion). The first cohort of scholars have taken a range of paths. Roughly 30% continued to Ph.D. level studies at esteemed universities, while others are employed by Goldman Sachs, McKinsey & Company, Google, J.P. Morgan & Co., the Associated Press, the Boston Consulting Group, General Electric, HNA Group, NEO blockchain, the Chinese Ministry of Commerce, and more. In addition to a fully funded scholarship, scholars also receive a monthly stipend of $500 and round-trip airfare.

Eligibility requirements and selection criteria

Eligibility requirements
Applicants for the scholarship must have completed their bachelor's degree before starting the scholarship program.
 Bachelor's (first undergraduate) degree in any field
 Demonstrated English language proficiency (Chinese language proficiency is not required)
 There isn't a strict age limit for applicants, but to date, no students over the age of 28 have been admitted to the programme 

 Marital status is not considered (however spouses or partners will not be funded by the scholarship or accommodated in the college)
 No citizenship requirements

Allocation
The Academy expects its "first cohort of Yenching Scholars to be from 47 universities, with the most numerous coming from Oxford, Yale, Harvard, Princeton, Cape Town, Cambridge, Chicago,  Stanford, United States Military Academy at West Point  and Leiden." Scholars "will represent 36 countries and regions, from Armenia and Australia to Vietnam and Zimbabwe."

Admission
Applicants can apply directly for either early admission or regular admission. Additionally, students who are nominated will submit their applications before the regular admission deadline.

See also
Gates Cambridge Scholarship and Churchill Scholarship at Cambridge University
Rhodes Scholarship at Oxford University
 Schwarzman Scholars at Tsinghua University
 Knight-Hennessy Scholars at Stanford University
 Yenching Academy of Peking University
 Harvard-Yenching Institute at Harvard University

References

External links
 Yenching Scholars website

Peking University
Scholarships in China